Airship Ventures Inc. was a private company that offered sight-seeing rides (which the company called "flightseeing") in a 12-passenger Zeppelin NT out of a World War II United States Navy hangar at Moffett Federal Airfield near Mountain View, California.

, their airship, built by Zeppelin Luftschifftechnik GmbH, is in a state of disassembly, but is still one of three zeppelins in the world. The ship was dedicated and christened Eureka at the 75th anniversary celebration for Moffett Field on November 21, 2008; its flight from Beaumont, Texas, where it was shipped, to the Bay Area was the first zeppelin flight in the United States in 71 years.

The company was owned by the husband and wife team of Alexandra and Brian Hall of Los Gatos, California.  Alexandra Hall previously ran the Chabot Space and Science Center in Oakland, California, and Brian Hall is the CEO of telecommunications software company Mark/Space. Two of their pilots, Katherine "Kate" Board (who left the company to fly another Zeppelin NT in Germany) and Andrea Deyling, are the only female zeppelin pilots in the world.

Airship Ventures was based out of the Bachelor Officer Quarters in Building 20 in the NASA Research Park. The airship was stored in the World War II era Hangar Two - a former blimp hangar.

On November 14, 2012, the company announced that it was closing its doors and grounding flight operations due to a lack of long-term sponsorship. In mid-December the decision was announced to wind up the company and disassemble the Eureka, which was shipped back to Germany.

See also
Deutsche Zeppelin Reederei (DZR), both the historic and current German Zeppelin passenger transport company

References

External links
 
 Official website as archived in September 2012, prior to cessation of operations
 NASA Welcomes Airship Ventures Zeppelin To Moffett Field 2008-10-23

Companies based in Santa Clara County, California
American companies established in 2007
Airlines established in 2008
Moffett Field
Aviation in California
Aviation in the United States
Airships
Airships of the United States